Triplophysa tenuis is a species of ray-finned fish in the genus Triplophysa.

References

tenuis
Fish described in 1877